Ukyr (Ükher) is a rural locality (a selo) in Yeravninsky District, Republic of Buryatia, Russia. The population was 90 as of 2019. There is 1 street.

Geography 
Ukyr is located 12 km west of Sosnovo-Ozerskoye (the district's administrative centre) by road. Sosnovo-Ozerskoye is the nearest rural locality.

References 

Rural localities in Yeravninsky District